Lionel Cox may refer to:
Lionel Cox (cyclist) (1930–2010), Australian cyclist
Lionel Cox (sport shooter) (born 1981), Belgian sport shooter
W. H. Lionel Cox (1844–1921), British lawyer from Mauritius and Chief Justice of the Straits Settlements
Lionel Cox (priest) (died 1945), Archdeacon of Madras
Lionel Howard Cox (1893–1949), British Army officer